Marko Juhani Yli-Hannuksela (born 21 December 1973 in Ilmajoki) is a Finnish former wrestler. His most notable accomplishments are his two Olympic medals and a world championship in Greco-Roman wrestling. After failing to qualify for 2008 Olympic Games, he decided to retire in August 2008.

His local sports team are the Ilmajoen Kisailijat, and he is coached by his father Seppo Yli-Hannuksela. He has five children with his wife Gita.

Accomplishments

Olympic Games
 Athens 2004 - silver (74 kg weight class)
 Sydney 2000 - bronze (76 kg)
 Atlanta 1996 - 15. (68 kg)

World Championships
 2006 - silver (74 kg)
 2005 - bronze (74 kg)
 2003 - 7. (74 kg)
 2002 - 9. (74 kg)
 2001 - 6. (76 kg)
 1999 - 10. (76 kg)
 1998 - 9. (76 kg)
 1997 - gold (76 kg)
 1995 - 8. (68 kg)
 1994 - 6. (68 kg)

European Championships
 2003 - 8. (74 kg)
 2002 - bronze (74 kg)
 2001 - 9. (76 kg)
 2000 - 12. (76 kg)
 1999 - 6. (76 kg)
 1998 - 7. (76 kg)
 1997 - 4. (69 kg)
 1996 - 5. (68 kg)
 1995 - bronze (68 kg)
 1994 - 12. (68 kg)

References

1973 births
Living people
People from Ilmajoki
Wrestlers at the 1996 Summer Olympics
Wrestlers at the 2000 Summer Olympics
Finnish male sport wrestlers
Wrestlers at the 2004 Summer Olympics
Olympic wrestlers of Finland
Olympic silver medalists for Finland
Olympic bronze medalists for Finland
Olympic medalists in wrestling
Medalists at the 2004 Summer Olympics
Medalists at the 2000 Summer Olympics
Sportspeople from South Ostrobothnia
20th-century Finnish people
21st-century Finnish people